Maksim Aleksandrovich Nasadyuk (born 11 February 1989) is a Russian former professional football player.

Club career
He made his Russian Football National League debut for FC Luch-Energiya Vladivostok on 18 March 2015 in a game against FC Sibir Novosibirsk.

External links
 

1989 births
Sportspeople from Vladivostok
Living people
Russian footballers
Association football defenders
FC Luch Vladivostok players
FC Okean Nakhodka players